Rhombodera stalii is a species of praying mantises in the family Mantidae, found on the island of Java in Indonesia.

See also
List of mantis genera and species

References

S
Mantodea of Asia
Insects described in 1912